Xiphotheata is a genus of longhorn beetles of the subfamily Lamiinae, containing the following species:

 Xiphotheata luctifera Fairmaire, 1881
 Xiphotheata moellendorfi (Flach, 1890)
 Xiphotheata saundersii Pascoe, 1864

References

Pteropliini